Bernard Dov Cooperman (born October 9, 1946) is a Louis L. Kaplan Associate Professor of Jewish History at the University of Maryland in the Department of History.  Cooperman was on the faculty of Harvard University until 1989, has been a Fellow of the Institute for Advanced Studies at Hebrew University of Jerusalem, and a Lilly Fellow (1994–95). He served as Director of the Meyerhoff Center for Jewish Studies from 1991 to 1997.

He received his B.A. from the University of Toronto in 1968, his M.A. from Brandeis University in 1969, his M.A. from Harvard University in 1972, and his Ph.D. from Harvard in 1976.

He is the author of In Iberia and Beyond: Hispanic Jews Between Cultures.

References

External links
 Faculty page at www.jewishstudies.umd.edu
 "Beware the Ideological Guards of Academia" - Jewish Daily Forward

Jewish historians
1946 births
Living people
20th-century American Jews
Canadian Jews
People from Toronto
University of Toronto alumni
Brandeis University alumni
Harvard University alumni
Harvard University faculty
University of Maryland, College Park faculty
21st-century American Jews